The Kaptol manors form a series of 25 manors (from ) along the Kaptol Street in Zagreb, Croatia that were used to house canons and other officials of the Archdiocese of Zagreb. The manors were built at various times between the Middle Ages and the 19th century. Most of those preserved date from the Baroque period (late 17th and 18th century), while those in the best condition are mostly from the 19th century. The manors were designed as large town houses surrounded by gardens. Each has its own history and peculiarities. The most important are those which were inhabited by prominent canons.

List of Kaptol manors by address
Houses in Croatia are usually numbered with ascending odd numbers on the left side and even numbers on the right side, starting from the end of the street close to city center. However, Kaptol Street is numbered clockwise, starting on the south end opposite the Zagreb Cathedral, proceeding on the west side north towards the intersection with Nova Ves, therefrom continuing back south on the east side and ending with the cathedral itself.

The 1788 visitation enumerated 27 manors. Of these, one is located outside Kaptol, and one, located at house number 30 (29a today), was demolished after the 1880 earthquake, leaving 25 Kaptol manors standing today. Almost all manors were damaged in the 2020 Zagreb earthquake.

Following is the list of manors aligned by house number that also contains brief description of each manor:

References

Bibliography 
 
 
 
 

Buildings and structures in Zagreb
Gornji Grad–Medveščak
Catholic Church in Croatia